Kilmainham (meaning "St Maighneann's church") is a south inner suburb of Dublin, Ireland, south of the River Liffey and west of the city centre. It is in the city's Dublin 8 postal district. The area was once known as Kilmanum.

History
In the Viking era, the monastery was home to the first Norse base (longphort) in Ireland. The Kilmainham Brooch, a late 8th- or early 9th-century Celtic brooch of the "penannular" type (i.e. its ring does not fully close or is incomplete) was unearthed in an 18th-century excavation of a Viking burial place in Kilmainham,

In the 12th century, the lands on the banks of the Liffey were granted to the Knights Hospitaller. Strongbow erected for them a castle about 2 kilometres or 1 mile distant from the Danish wall of old Dublin; and Hugh Tyrrel, first Baron Castleknock, granted them part of the lands which now form the Phoenix Park. The Knights of St. John of Jerusalem remained in possession of the land until the dissolution of the monasteries in the 16th century.

Until the time of Queen Elizabeth, when Dublin Castle became the centre of English power, the Lord Lieutenants often held court at the manor of Kilmainham. In 1559,   Thomas Radclyffe, 3rd Earl of Sussex, on being again appointed Lord Lieutenant, found that the building at Kilmainham had been damaged by a storm, and had to hold court at the palace of St. Sepulchre.  The following year Elizabeth ordered that Dublin Castle be upgraded to enable the Lord Lieutenant to reside there, and Kilmainham fell out of favour.

The Manor of Kilmainham formed a liberty outside the jurisdiction of the city of Dublin, with its own rights and privileges. The manor took in parts of James's Street and side streets and stretched as far as Lucan and Chapelizod. After the Reformation, former lords (or chairmen, as they were later called) of this manor included Lord Cloncurry and Sir Edward Newenham. John "Bully" Egan, from Charleville, County Cork, was chairman from 1790 to 1800. These manorial rights were abolished after the Municipal Corporations (Ireland) Act 1840, and much of the area was included within the city.

 The portion still outside the city in the latter part of the nineteenth century was within the township of New Kilmainham, a municipality governed by town commissioners, first under the Towns Improvement (Ireland) Act 1854 and then under a local act, the New Kilmainham Township Act 1868. From 1868, New Kilmainham comprised the townlands of Kilmainham, Goldenbridge North, Inchicore North, Inchicore South, and Butchers Arms. It became an urban district under the Local Government (Ireland) Act 1898. In 1900, the urban district was abolished and the area was transferred from the county into the jurisdiction of the city of Dublin as the New Kilmainham ward.

Local attractions 

The area is best known for Royal Hospital Kilmainham, constructed on the site where the Knights of St. John of Jerusalem had their priory in Dublin. It now houses the Irish Museum of Modern Art. The Richmond Tower marks the junction between the formal pedestrianised avenue leading to the Royal Hospital, and the South Circular Road. Nearby is Kilmainham Gaol, where the executions of the leaders of the Easter Rising took place.

Kilmainham holds one of a small number of Viking era burial sites (Old Norse haugr meaning barrow or mound), within Dublin, others including Bully's Acre and where College Green is now located.

Railway station 
The Dublin Heuston railway station, one of Dublin's three main railway stations, is nearby.

Notable people 
Former or current residents of the town have included:
Katherine Lynch (born 1967), Irish television personality resides in the area.

References

External links

 Maps of New Kilmainham:
 New Kilmainham layer on OpenStreetMap
 Dublin Historic Maps: Dublin Townships and Urban Districts, between 1847 and 1930
 1887 Ordnance Survey Ireland sheets available from UCD Library, with index at 1894 sheet XVIII.
 A tourist map of the area

 
Towns and villages in Dublin (city)
Viking Age populated places
Uppercross